William Bacon Oliver (May 23, 1867 – May 27, 1948) was a Congressman from Alabama.

He was born in Eutaw, Alabama, graduated from the University of Alabama in 1887 and from the law department in 1889.  After additional courses at the University of Virginia in the same year, he was admitted to the Alabama bar, and set up a practice in Tuscaloosa.

He became dean of the law school of the University of Alabama in 1909, serving until 1913, then ran successfully for Congress in 1914, and remained there  for eleven Congresses, not standing for reelection in 1936.

He then served as a special assistant to the United States Attorney General from 1939 to 1944, at which time he retired.  He died in 1948, and is buried in the Eutaw Cemetery in Eutaw.

The William Bacon Oliver Lock and Dam on the Black Warrior River in Alabama is named after him, as is Oliver Lake behind the dam.

References

Black Warrior River hydrologic modifications
Political Graveyard biography

External links
 Memorabilia at the University of Alabama

1867 births
1948 deaths
People from Eutaw, Alabama
Deans of law schools in the United States
Alabama lawyers
University of Alabama faculty
Democratic Party members of the United States House of Representatives from Alabama